Karl Flacher was an Austrian luger who competed in the mid-1970s. A natural track luger, he won the bronze medal in the men's doubles event at the 1974 FIL European Luge Natural Track Championships in Niedernsill, Austria.

References
Natural track European Championships results 1970-2006.

Austrian male lugers
Living people
Year of birth missing (living people)